Gary Marchionini is an American information scientist and educator at the University of North Carolina at Chapel Hill (1998-present).

Work 
Gary Marchionini is a leader in defining theory of human information interaction and exploratory search and his work sits at the intersection of human-computer interaction and information retrieval, a subdomain known as human-computer information interaction (HCIR). His 1995 book, Information Seeking in Electronic Environments has been influential in shaping our understanding of search as a learning activity that is dependent not only on individual search capabilities and preferences but on the nature of the topical domain, the search task, and the features of the search system.  A pioneer in the development of digital libraries, he led the development of one of the early digital video repositories, the Open Video Project and chaired the 2008 ACM/IEEE Joint Conference on Digital Libraries Conference and was program chair for the 2006 conference. His research has been supported by the U.S. National Science Foundation and several other foundations and corporate research laboratories.

Marchionini is the Cary C. Boshamer Professor and Dean of the School of Information and Library Science at UNC-Chapel Hill. He was professor at the University of Maryland information school and a member of the Human-Computer Interaction Laboratory (1983-1998). He served as President of the American Society for Information Science and Technology (2009-10) and received its Award of Merit in 2011. He served as Editor-in-Chief for the ACM Transactions on Information Systems Journal (2002-2008) and is editor of the Morgan-Claypool Lecture Series Information Concepts, Retrieval and Services.

References

External links
 Gary Marchionini's personal website

American information theorists
Living people
Place of birth missing (living people)
University of Maryland, College Park faculty
University of North Carolina at Chapel Hill faculty
Wayne State University alumni
Western Michigan University alumni
Year of birth missing (living people)